The 1954 UCLA Bruins football team was an American football team that represented the University of California, Los Angeles (UCLA) in the Pacific Coast Conference during the 1954 college football season. They played their home games at the Los Angeles Memorial Coliseum and were coached by Red Sanders. It was Sanders' sixth season as the UCLA head coach; the Bruins finished 9–0 overall, and were Pacific Coast Conference Champions with a 6–0 record. In nine games, UCLA outscored their opponents, 367 to 40.

The Bruins were not eligible to play in the Rose Bowl vs. Ohio State (ranked No. 1 in the AP Poll) because of the PCC's "no repeat" rule, in effect for most of the decade, after California lost a third straight Rose Bowl in January 1951. Since UCLA had played in the 1954 Rose Bowl, they were excluded from the 1955 event. The game likely would have made for a de facto national championship game, but thus, rival USC (whom the Bruins soundly defeated 34–0) went instead, and lost 20–7 to Ohio State.  Following the outcome, UCLA and Ohio State split the national championship.

UCLA was selected national champion by NCAA-designated major selectors of Dunkel,  Football Writers Association of America (FWAA), Litkenhous, National Championship Foundation, and United Press International (Coaches Poll), and co-champion by both Football Research and Helms. This consensus national championship is claimed by the school. Ohio State was selected national champion by the AP Poll among other selectors.

During the season, the Bruins debuted their powder blue uniforms, referred to as "powder-keg blue" by head coach Sanders, that featured two white stripes around the shoulders. The white uniforms with blue stripes were used the previous season during the game against USC but this was the earliest known instance of the stripes becoming a regular part of the UCLA uniform.

Previous season
The Bruins finished the 1953 regular season with a 9–1 record, and won the Pacific Coast Conference at 6–1; the loss was by a point (20–21) at Stanford. UCLA participated in the 1954 Rose Bowl, but lost 20–28 to the #5 Michigan State Spartans.

Schedule

Game summaries

San Diego Navy

    
    
    
    
    
    
    
    
    
    

The Bruins had originally scheduled Santa Clara to open their season but after the Broncos suspended football, the San Diego Naval Training Center was scheduled as a replacement. Although the San Diego NTC featured players such as All-American Bucky Curtis from Vanderbilt and All-PCC Earl Stelle from Oregon, UCLA was favored three touchdowns.

Primo Villanueva scored the first two touchdowns of the game and the Bruins led 13–0 within 7 minutes. Bruce Ballard, Sam Brown, Villaneuva, and Bob Davenport would each score another running touchdown giving the Bruins a 40–0 halftime lead. Davenport, Gerry McDougal, and Doug Peters would each score three more running touchdowns and Ronnie Loudd would score a passing touchdown from Gerry McDougal  to give UCLA a punishing 67–0 victory.

Kansas

    
    
    
    
    
    

The Bruins scored three consecutive touchdowns in the first quarter. Kansas player Ralph Moody scored the first Kansas touchdown on an 82-yard punt return. Jack Ellena would score on a 50-yard punt return in the fourth quarter and Don Shinnick would score on a 73-yard run to give the Bruins a 32–7 victory.

Maryland

    
    
    

Maryland were the 1953 national champions. Bob Davenport gained 89 yard on 23 carries and scored both of UCLA's touchdowns. Maryland's Howard Dare scored a touchdown on a pass from Charley Boxold to give the Terrapins the lead early in the fourth quarter. Davenport scored the go ahead touchdown in the middle of the fourth quarter to give the Bruins the victory.

Washington

    
    
    
    
    
    

Bob Davenport scored two rushing touchdowns, Primo Villanueva scored one rushing touchdown, and Johnny Herman converted all three extra points to give UCLA a 21–0 led midway through the third quarter. After Bruins Coach Sanders replaced his starters with his second and third string players, Washington quarterback Bob Cox threw a passing touchdown to Dean Derby and Bob Dunn converted the extra point to reduce UCLA's lead to 21–7 at the end of the third quarter.

In the fourth quarter, Sam Brown fumbled which allowed Washington to recover at the UCLA 25. Cox threw another touchdown, this time to Corky Lewis but Dunn missed the extra point kick. Brown fumbled again for a 13-yard loss and Washington scored another passing touchdown on a 56-yard drive. Dunn's extra point reduced the UCLA lead to 21–20 with 2:30 minutes left. The Bruins would hold out to win the game.

Stanford

    
    
    
    
    
    
    
    
    
    
    

The Bruin defense intercepted Stanford quarterbacks Jerry Gustafson and John Neff eight times and returned them for 210 total yards. Sam Brown set a new conference record for punt returns with 132 yards in three returns. Villanueva, Davenport and Brown each scored twice while Decker, Loudd, Heydenfeldt and McDougall scored once each for a total of 10 touchdowns.

Oregon State

    
    
    
    
    
    
    
    
    

Sam Brown scored two touchdowns and Bob Davenport, Johnny Hermann, Primo Villanueva, Doug Peters, Don Shinnick, Russ Hampton, and Clarence Norris each scored a touchdown to give UCLA the 61–0 victory over Oregon State. The Bruins rushed for 498 yards and 593 total yards while holding Oregon State to 88 rushing yards and 111 total yards.

California

    
    
    
    
    

Primo Villanueva rushed for two touchdowns in the first half and threw a touchdown pass to Johnny Hermann in the fourth. Cal's Paul Larson set new Bears record for passes (38), pass completions (25), and pass yards (280) and Williams scored the Bear's lone touchdown on a 7-yard run.

Oregon

    
    
    
    
    
    

With the victory, UCLA set a new single scoring record of 333 points, surpassing the previous record of 327 points in just 8 games. Rommie Loudd scored the first points of the game on a 16-yard pass from Primo Villanueva. Bob Davenport, Jim Decker, Doug Bradley, Sam Brown, and Rommie Loudd each scored rushing touchdowns. Oregon only moved passed the 50 yard line two and the UCLA defense limited George Shaw, the country's leading passer with 178 yard per game, to only 29 yards.

USC

    
    
    
    
    

A 48-yard pass from Primo Villanueva to Bob Heydenfeldt gave UCLA a 7–0 first quarter lead. The Bruins poured on with four touchdowns in the fourth quarter: Bob Davenport scored from the one-yard line, Villanueva passed to Terry Debay for a 12-yard touchdown, Rommie Loudd caught a pass from Doug Bradley for an 8-yard touchdown, and Sam Brown passed to Bruce Ballard for a 17-yard touchdown. USC had only 5 yards rushing.

Personnel

Roster

Coaching staff

Henry "Red" Sanders returned to coach the Bruins for the sixth season. The Bruin coaching staff included four future college head coaches, including three (Barnes, Dickerson, and Prothro) who would eventually serve as UCLA head coaches.

Statistics

Team

Scores by quarter

Offense

Rushing

Passing

Receiving

Defense

Special teams

(Statistics compiled from individual NCAA game summaries)

Ranking

Awards and honors
All-American
First Team All-American (Consensus)
Jack Ellena (AAB, AFCA, AP, INS, NEA, SN, UP)
First Team All-American 
Bob Davenport (AP-2, FWAA, INS-2, NEA-2, UP-3, CP-2)
Jim Salsbury (AFCA, AP-3, FWAA, INS-2, NEA-2, UP-2, CP-3)
Second Team All-American
Primo Villaneva (AP-HR, UP-2, CP-HR, NEA-HR)
Honorable Mention All-American
Sam Boghosian (UP-HR)
Herdiman Cureton (UP-HR, UP-HR)
Bob Heydenfeldt (UP-HR)
Bob Long (AP-HR)
Ronnie Loudd (UP-HR)
Terry Debay (UP-HR)
Jim Decker (UP-HR)
John Peterson (UP-HR, CP-HR)
Joe Ray (AP-HR, UP-HR)
Coaches' All-PCC
All-PCC First Team
Bob Davenport
Jim Salsbury
Primo Villaneva
Jack Ellena
All-PCC Second Team
Sam Boghosian
Herdiman Cureton
Bob Long
Jim Decker
Joe Ray
Honorable Mention
John Hermann
Terry Debay
Gil Moreno
John Peterson
UP All-Coast Team
All-Coast First Team
Bob Davenport
Jack Ellena
Jim Salsbury
Primo Villaneva
All-Coast Second Team
Sam Boghosian
Herdiman Cureton
Bob Heydenfeldt
AP All-Pacific Coast Team
All-Pacific First Team
Bob Davenport
Jack Ellena
Bob Long
Jim Salsbury
All-Pacific Second Team
Sam Boghosian
Herdiman Cureton
Joe Ray
Primo Villaneva

1955 NFL Draft

source:

References

UCLA
UCLA Bruins football seasons
College football national champions
Pac-12 Conference football champion seasons
College football undefeated seasons
UCLA Bruins football
UCLA Bruins football